District 7 School may refer to:
District 7 School (Hanson, Massachusetts)
District 7 School (Groton, Massachusetts)

See also
 District 7 (disambiguation)